Gwiazda, also known as The Polish Weekly-"Star" and Gwiazda Wolnosci (Star of Freedom), was a Polish language weekly published  by Stanislaw Walczak in Holyoke,Massachusetts from 1923 to 1953, after which it was called The Star and published in English from 1953 until 1956. It was Holyoke's first and longest running Polish newspaper.

References

External links
 Gwiazda, Library of Congress
 Gwiazda, August 29, 1942 issue, Internet Archive
 Gwiazda, April 14, 1945 issue, Internet Archive

Polish-language newspapers published in the United States
Polish-American culture in Massachusetts
Non-English-language newspapers published in Massachusetts
1923 establishments in Massachusetts
Newspapers established in 1923
Publications disestablished in 1956
1956 disestablishments in Massachusetts
Mass media in Holyoke, Massachusetts